Hochschorner is a surname. Notable people with the surname include:

Pavol Hochschorner (born 1979), Slovakian slalom canoeist
Peter Hochschorner (born 1979), Slovakian slalom canoeist, twin brother of Pavol

See also
 Hochschober